Colin Daley (born 12 April 1975) is a British taekwondo practitioner. He competed in the men's +80 kg event at the 2000 Summer Olympics.

References

1975 births
Living people
British male taekwondo practitioners
Olympic taekwondo practitioners of Great Britain
Taekwondo practitioners at the 2000 Summer Olympics
Sportspeople from London